The 2006 Men's European Volleyball League was the third edition of the European Volleyball League, organised by Europe's governing volleyball body, the CEV. The final Four was held in Izmir, Turkey from 19 to 20 August 2006.

Competing nations

Squads

League round

|}

Final four

Semi-finals

3rd place match

Final

Final standing

Awards

 Most Valuable Player
  Guido Görtzen
 Best Scorer
  Marko Klok
 Best Spiker
  Michael Olieman
 Best Blocker
  Sotirios Pantaleon
 Best Server
  Tomislav Coskovic
 Best Libero
  Nuri Şahin

References 
 Official website

European Volleyball League
E
Volleyball
League
Sports competitions in Izmir
2000s in İzmir